The Los Angeles Metro Rail is an urban rail transit system in Los Angeles County, California, operated by the Los Angeles County Metropolitan Transportation Authority (LACMTA or Metro). The system includes 99 metro stations with two rapid transit (known locally as a subway) and four light rail lines, covering  of route service. In 2019, the Metro Rail system served an average 295,889 passengers each weekday, totaling 93.2 million passengers in the calendar year. Metro Rail is one of the largest rapid transit and light rail systems in the United States by ridership. The system is complemented by two Metro Busway bus rapid transit lines.

History
The next Metro Rail line, the rapid transit Red Line, opened on January 30, 1993, between Union Station and  station. The light rail Green Line, the system's third line, opened on August 12, 1995 from Norwalk to  stations. Metro Rail's next expansion occurred on May 22, 1996, when the Red Line expanded westward from Westlake/MacArthur Park to  stations. The final section of the Red Line opened on June 24, 2000, from Hollywood/Vine station to  station, completing the Red Line as originally planned. A fourth Metro Rail line, the light rail Gold Line, opened on July 27, 2003 between Union Station and  station in Pasadena. The rapid transit Purple Line became the fifth Metro Rail line on August 24, 2006, when LACMTA separated the Red Line into two separate services; the branch between Union Station and Wilshire/Western station became the Purple Line while the branch between Union Station and North Hollywood station remained the Red Line. The Gold Line was later extended to Atlantic station in East Los Angeles on November 15, 2009. The light rail Expo Line opened between 7th Street/Metro Center and La Cienega/Jefferson on April 28, 2012; two additional stations opened on June 20, 2012. An extension to the Expo Line on May 20, 2016 added seven stations.

System
The system has 99 stations serving its seven lines. Six of these stations are transfer stations, which allow passengers to transfer between lines. Twelve of these stations are termini—stations at the end of lines. 49 of the stations are within the city of Los Angeles and the other 44 stations are located in surrounding communities in Los Angeles County.

Lines
There are seven Metro Rail lines, each of which is associated with a letter.

List of stations 
For stations served by more than one line, lines are listed in the order of opening.

Future stations

Notes

References

External links

 01

LACMTA
Los Angeles County Metro Rail
 Stations
 Stations
Los Angeles County Metropolitan Transportation Authority